"No Judgement" is a song by Irish singer Niall Horan. It was released through Capitol Records as the third single from his second studio album Heartbreak Weather on February 7, 2020.

Background
The song's title was first teased in the music video for "Nice To Meet Ya". Horan announced the song's release on February 4, 2020.

Composition
"No Judgement" is a sultry pop anthem that was compared to his song "Slow Hands". It has a smooth, upbeat melody and a punchy production with strumming guitar melody and a catchy hook.  In terms of music notation, "No Judgement" was composed using  common time in the key of C# minor, with a tempo of 100 beats per minute. The song follows the chord progression of C#m-E-E/G#-A. Horan's vocal range spans from the low note C#4 to the high note of F#5, giving the song one octave and three notes of range.

Live performances
On 11 March 2020, Horan performed the song for the first time on The Late Late Show with James Corden.

Music video
The Drew Kirsch-directed music video accompanied the song's release. The music video starts out with Horan wearing a James Bond-esque white suit and talking to the viewer about a period called "No Judgement" that appears instead of the need to impress; it then transitions to him singing along and spectating scenes of an elderly couple doing random things in the rest of the video. The music video has received over 18 million views as of February 2022.

Chart performance
The song debuted at number 97 on the Billboard Hot 100, becoming Horan's fifth entry on the chart. The song was more successful in Europe where in Ireland it charted at number 6 becoming the fifth top 10 hit from the album in Horan's home country and at number 39 in Scotland becoming the sixth top 40 hit in the country. Additionally the song also entered at number 47 in Belgium and number 32 in the UK becoming his fifth top 40 charting single in the country.

Credits and personnel
Credits adapted from Tidal.

 Julian Bunetta – production, songwriting, backing vocals, drums, guitar, keyboards, programming
 Tobias Jesso Jr. – production, songwriting
 Alexander Izquierdo – songwriting
 John Ryan – songwriting
 Niall Horan – songwriting, backing vocals, guitar, vocals
 Will Quinell – assistant mastering engineer, studio personnel
 Matt Wolach – assistant mixer, studio personnel
 Michael Freeman – assistant mixer, studio personnel
 Jesse Munsat – assistant recording engineer, studio personnel
 Aaron Sterling – drums, percussion
 Jeff 'Da Badass' Gunnell – engineer, studio personnel
 Nate Mercereau – guitar
 Chris Gehringer – mastering engineer, studio personnel
 Mark 'Spike' Stent – mixer, studio personnel

Track listing

Charts

Certifications

Release history

References

2020 singles
2020 songs
Niall Horan songs
Songs written by Niall Horan
Songs written by Julian Bunetta
Songs written by Tobias Jesso Jr.
Songs written by Eskeerdo
Songs written by John Ryan (musician)